Persoonia silvatica, commonly known as the forest geebung, is a plant in the family Proteaceae and is endemic to south-eastern Australia. It is a shrub or tree with more or less lance-shaped leaves and small groups of yellow flowers with white centres. It grows mainly in forest near the border between New South Wales and Victoria.

Description
They are narrow elliptic to lance-shaped, or narrow spatula-shaped to lance-shaped with the narrower end towards the base. They are flat and smooth, the upper surface a darker colour than the lower one, and the leaves are hairy when young but become glabrous as they age. The flowers are arranged in groups called racemes in leaf axils, or on the ends of branches, and some of the groups continue to grow into leafy shoots. The central style is surrounded by four white anthers which are also joined at the base with the tips rolled back, so that they resemble a cross when viewed end-on. The ovary at the base of the style is glabrous.

Taxonomy and naming
Persoonia silvatica was first formally described in 1957 by botanist Lawrie Johnson based on plant material collected at Brown Mountain in New South Wales by Ernst Betche in 1893. The specific epithet (silvatica) is a Latin word meaning "of woods".

Distribution and habitat
Persoonia silvatica occurs in montane forest along the Great Dividing Range in East Gippsland and south-eastern New South Wales including localities Bendoc, the Errinundra Plateau, Mount Kaye and Howe Hill in Victoria and Monga, Tinderry Peak and Mount Currockbilly in New South Wales. Plants that are believed to be hybrids of this species with Persoonia confertiflora have been noted at Genoa in Victoria.

References

Flora of New South Wales
Flora of Victoria (Australia)
silvatica
Plants described in 1957